City of Peterborough Hockey Club is a field hockey club that is based at The City of Peterborough Sports Club, Bretton Gate, Westwood, Peterborough.

The club is a relatively new club only being formed in 1996. However this was as a result of a merger between the Peterborough Town Hockey Club (founded in the 1930s) and the Peterborough Athletic Hockey Club. Despite only being formed in recent times the club has experienced significant success in recent seasons with the men's team reaching the Men's England Hockey League Division One North.

The club runs eight men's teams  and four women's teams,  with the women's first XI playing in the Women's East Region Premier Division.

References

English field hockey clubs
2006 establishments in England
Sport in Cambridgeshire
Sport in Peterborough